CFXE-FM is a Canadian radio station licensed to Edson, Alberta. Owned by Stingray Group, it broadcasts a country format branded as Real Country. Alongside its main signal in Edson, the station maintains three rebroadcasters in northwestern Alberta; CFXH-FM in Hinton, CFXP-FM in Jasper, and CFXG-FM in Grande Cache. The station also maintains a satellite studio in Hinton, and broadcasts their afternoon show (12 Noon - 6PM) from Hinton.

History
CFXE signed on April 4, 1968, as CJYR on 970 kHz, with 10,000 watts power. In 2005, the station was bought by Newcap Broadcasting and was relaunched as The Fox. In 2007, the station was moved to 94.3 MHz with 11,000 watts power.

On September 29, 2010, the station received CRTC approval to move CFXE-FM's rebroadcast transmitter, CFXG (AM 1230) in Grande Cache, to the FM dial. Grande Cache's new FM transmitter now operates at 93.3 MHz known as CFXG-FM.

In July 2017, the station rebranded as Real Country, and flipped to country.

Rebroadcasters

References

External links
 
 
 

Fxe
Edson, Alberta
Fxe
Fxe
Radio stations established in 1968
1968 establishments in Alberta